Shonia is a genus of plants in the family Euphorbiaceae first described as a genus in 2005. The entire genus is endemic to Australia.

Species
 Shonia bickertonensis (Specht) Halford & R.J.F.Hend. - N NT
 Shonia carinata Halford & R.J.F.Hend. - S Qld
 Shonia territorialis Halford & R.J.F.Hend. - N NT
 Shonia tristigma (F.Muell.) Halford & R.J.F.Hend. - N Qld

References 

Euphorbiaceae genera
Crotonoideae
Endemic flora of Australia